United Nations Security Council Resolution 367, adopted on 12 March 1975, after receiving a complaint from the Government of the Republic of Cyprus, the Council again called upon all States to respect the sovereignty, independence, territorial integrity and non-alignment of the Republic of Cyprus.

The Council noted its regret over the unilateral declaration of the Turkish Federated State, though it did not wish to prejudge the final political settlement of the problem. The resolution then goes on to call for the urgent and effective implementation of General Assembly resolution 3212, to request the Secretary-General undertake a new mission to convene the parties and called upon them to co-operate.  The Council finally called upon all parties concerned to refrain from any action which might jeopardize the negotiations and requested the Secretary-General to keep them informed on the implementation of the resolutions.

The resolution was adopted without vote.

See also
 Cyprus dispute
 List of United Nations Security Council Resolutions 301 to 400 (1971–1976)
 Turkish Invasion of Cyprus

References
Text of the Resolution at UN.org

External links
 

 0367
 0367
1975 in Cyprus
March 1975 events